Vanali is a medium size village located in Gadhda division of Botad district, Saurashtra, India with 279 families residing.

Demographics

The Vanali village has population of 1,633 of which 852 are males while 781 are females as per Population Census 2011. The Village has lower literacy rate compared to Gujarat. In 2011, literacy rate of Vanali village was 71.71% compared to 78.03% of Gujarat. In Vanali Male literacy stands at 78.82% while female literacy rate was 63.89%.

References 

Villages in Botad district